Herman Joseph Heuser (1872 - 1933) was a Catholic priest, author, and educator.

He obtained the degree of Doctor of Divinity.

The Philadelphia Archdiocesan Historical Research Center holds records relating to the correspondence between him and prominent figures in the Catholic Church, including Cardinal James Gibbons, and Archbishop Patrick Ryan of Philadelphia, Mother Katharine Drexel, Thomas C. Middleton, O.S.A. With these are conserved letters from other noted persons: Oliver Wendell Holmes, Jr., Princess Catherine Radziwiłł, Leopold Stokowski, etc. The "lot" includes archival materials dealing with publication of the book My New Curate by the Irish author Canon Patrick Augustine Sheehan, and also has papers deriving from Heuser's work with the American Ecclesiastical Review and the Dolphin Magazine. A scrapbook entitled Commentarius de Judicio Sacramental holds both prayers and poems and newspaper clippings, all on a variety of spiritual topics. Heuser edited the 1905 edition of the German theologian, Caspar Schieler's work:Theory and practice of the confessional; a guide in the administration of the sacrament of penance.

References

1872 births
1933 deaths